Okobo is located in the South Eastern part of Nigeria and is a Local Government Area of Akwa Ibom State. Following the local government creation exercise of the federal government in 1989 Okobo Local Government Area was carved out of Oron, Akwa Ibom same year.

History

The local government area is bounded by Uruan in the North-West, Oyono Estuary in the North East, Oron, Akwa Ibom in the East, Urue-Offong/Oruko in the South-East, Nsit Atai in the West, Esit Eket in the south, and Nsit Ubium in the South West.

Okobo is one of the five Oron people Local Government in Akwa Ibom State. The local government is made up of Four (4) clans (where some are now known as district) out of the Nine (9) Oron Clans (Afaha) which are Afaha Okpo, Afaha Ukwong, Afaha Ibighi, Afaha Ebughu and Afaha Okiuso with three being the Okobo people clan known as Odu, Eta and Atabong said to be formed by one of the Obolo people kinsmen /  warrior that left with the Oron people during the great migration from Usakedet (Afaha Edit) now Usangele Area in Cameroon.

Okobo people are friendly and  peaceful people. They are very protective of their people. In the Ancient times if any strangers who tried to enter the boundary villages  with sophisticated charms or weapon with the intention to harm or cause riots and threatened the peace of the indigenes was being disbanded automatically due to the charms of protection hung across every corner of the community.

Language
Several languages are spoken in Okobo local government area because of the complex constitution of the local government area. Okobo language in spoken in Odu and Eta clans. Oro language is spoken in Atak Oro. Efik language is widely spoken in Atabong clan.

Clans and settlement

The area has Seven Clans (now districts) in Okobo namely Afaha Eta, Odu, Atabong, Afaha Ukwong, Ebughu, Afaha Okiuso and Ibighi. Okobo people are in the first three districts - Odu, Eta and Atabong while the Atak Oro people (a defunct LGA) reside in the remaining four districts. To the North is Esuk Inwang (4° 56' 0" North, 8° 6' 0" East) and to the South is Nda(4° 47' 55” North, 8° 7' 34”East). The Coordinates of Nung Atai Eta are 4°51'0" N and 8°7'60" E and those of  Odobo are 4° 49' 32 North and 8° 6' 38” East.

Akiba Obo
Anua Ekeya
Ebighi Edu
Ebighi Okobo
Ekpene Ekim
Esuk Inwang
Idibenin
Nda
Nung Ukana
Obot Inwang
Ube
Ufok Esuk

Eta consist of Seventeen (17) town and villages which includes;

Afaha Nsung
Akananwana
Amamong
Anua Okopedi
Ape Amamong
Atai Amamong
Ata Atai Otope
Atipa Odobo
Ebighi Eta
Ekpene Ekim Eta
Ibawa
Mbieduo
Nsating
Nung Atai Eta
Nung Atai Odobo
Nung Udom Odobo
Obufi.

Atabong consist of four villages which is

Ikot Iquo
Ikot Odiong
Ikot Okokon
Ikot Osukpong.

Afaha Ukwong Clan consist of fifteen (15) town and villages which includes

Afaha Osu
Ebighi Anwa Ikpi
Ebighi Anwa Oro
Etieke Udong Eto
Eweme
Eyo Nku
Itak Uyati
Mbukpo Oduobo
Ndoung
Osu Offi
Oti Oron
Otieke
Ubak
Utine Eyekung
Utine Ndoung.

Afaha Ebughu Clan consist of five villages which includes

Eyede
Ikono Oro
Nsie
Uruting

Afaha Okiuso Clan consist of Nine (9) villages which includes

Akai Nyo
Isa Okiuso
Itak Okiuso
Udung Afiang
Udung Amkpe
Udung Ukpong
Udung Ulo
Udung Umo

Afaha Ibighi Clan consist of four (4) villages that is

Afaha Akai
Atiabang
Oyoku Assang
Urue Ita

Natural resources
Okobo is endowed with a tropical forest, resources with mahogany for supply of wood for boat, housing and canoe construction. There are significant deposits of clay, fine sand and crude oil. Fishing and farming are common in this local government area.

Culture 

The cultural heritage is demonstrated in several traditional dances and masquerades such as Ekpe.

The traditional marriage ceremonies in Okobo are similar to those of the Efiks. The list include:

 Knocking drinks (Mmin ukong usung)
 Prayer drinks (Mmin akam)
 Drinks for expressing intention (mmin ukop iko)
 Introduction Drinks (Mmin mbup)
 Appreciation drinks (Mmin ekom)

This list is just for the Mbub (introductory) ceremony. The traditional marriage list (Nkpo Ndo) comes with its own set of rites and “gifts.” However, the “bride-price” used to be a  standard £12 (bon duopeba).

Traditional marriage ceremony (Ndo) 

On the day of the proper ceremony which takes place at the bride's family house, the groom and his family will be seated with the bride's father and his kinsmen in a sitting room while other guests seat outside, the announcer or moderator known as Mma Ofiori Ndo [ female] Ette Ofiori Ndo [male] will announce each item to be presented to the hearing of the guests seated outside. One of the major items to be presented is a box ‘Ekebe’ which contains different kinds of clothing, accessories, shoes to show how the groom will take care of the wife he is to be given.

The bride price Okuk Ndo is paid, Ufop Iso Eka Eyen is paid to the bride's mother, Ufop Iso Ete Eyen is paid to the bride's father, the groom also pays Okpono Ndidito loosen the ties on his bride's feet and arms to officially claim her.

When the ofiori ndo calls for drinks to be presented to the bride's family, two well adorned maidens emerge with a brass tray containing the drinks [known as akpankpang] balanced on their heads for presentation. The akpangkpang an expensive commodity is very rare these days because not every family can afford it. Royal families who own it put it up for hire to those in need.

After meeting all the formalities, the groom who is usually dressed in a white singlet, a wrapper {nsobo], beaded shoes and a cap is ready to make his entrance to the arena where guests are seated, his friends troop in with him holding a beautiful ceremonial umbrella over his head while dancing to beautiful traditional drums and songs.

When he takes his seat, the bride, dressed in a ball like Elizabethan gown {onyoyo}, a beautiful staff and hair plaited up {ETINGHE} and designed with bronze combs{edisat] down to her neck or waist, makes her entrance with the ekombi dance and her friends follow closely behind dancing and cheering. She dances round curtseying in appreciation to the guests before she takes a seat beside her groom.

The final rite is the presentation of mostly kitchen wares by the bride's mother and her family to the bride, these gifts are usually all an Okobo bride needs to keep her home running as nothing is seldom lacking. The ceremony ends as the couple take the dance floor while well wishers join them ad mist eating, drinking and much jubilation.

See also
 Oron people
 Urue-Offong/Oruko
 Mbo, Akwa Ibom
 Oron, Akwa Ibom
 Udung Uko
 Obolo, Akwa Ibom
 Akwa Ibom State
 Oron Nation

References

Sources 
 
 Okobo LGA | Helloakwaibom
 Efik Marriage “Knocking” Ceremony - Mbub Ndo K’ido Efik | Rosemary Aqua
 List Of Traditional Marriage Requirements In Calabar/Efik
 Okon Uya A history of Oron people of the lower Cross River basin - 1984 
 Efik and Calabar Traditional Marriage List and requirements

Oron people
Local Government Areas in Akwa Ibom State
Places in Oron Nation